"Phases" is episode 15 of season two of Buffy the Vampire Slayer. It was written by series story editors Rob Des Hotel and Dean Batali, and first broadcast on January 27, 1998.

Plot
Cordelia and Xander are attacked by a werewolf that rips a hole in her car's roof. Giles points out that there have been several other attacks, though so far only animals have been killed. During high school gym class, it is revealed that at least two students have been bitten lately: Oz by a cousin, and school macho Larry by a dog.

After some research, Giles finds out that a werewolf is a wolf for three nights — the coming night would be the second. Since the werewolf is human the rest of the month, it would be wrong to kill it. This, however, is not the view of werewolf hunter Cain who is out for his twelfth pelt.

Buffy and Giles rush to The Bronze, where the werewolf crashes the party. Buffy tries to catch it with a chain but fails. Cain joins them and points out that it will be Buffy's fault if the werewolf kills anybody. A body does turn up the next morning: Theresa, one of the students. Buffy is not the only one to have feelings of guilt. Oz wakes up in the forest, naked and confused after changing back from his wolf state. Recalling the bite he got, he calls his Aunt Maureen, and bluntly asks if his cousin is a werewolf.

Xander figures that Larry is the most obvious suspect because of the dog bite. When he confronts Larry alone in the gym locker room, it turns out that he really is hiding his homosexuality. Xander unwittingly leaves Larry with the impression that Xander is gay, too. Back in the library, Buffy suggests to Willow that she might have to make the first move if she wants to speed things up with Oz.

Buffy realizes that the reports of Theresa's body did not mention any mauling. She and Xander get to the funeral home in time to watch her rise as a vampire. Theresa passes along greetings from Angelus before Xander stakes her. Buffy is left shaken by this and Xander comforts her.

Cain busies himself casting silver bullets for the hunt. Willow visits Oz right before sundown. Oz is about to chain himself up, but lets Willow in the house. Her rant about the mixed signals he is sending is interrupted by him changing into a werewolf. She flees the house screaming, Oz in pursuit. Cain hears the wolf's cry and joins the hunt. The werewolf is distracted by a scent which Cain set as a trap, and Willow escapes and then finds Giles and Buffy, who are about to start the hunt for Oz with a tranquilizer gun. All parties meet in a clearing in the forest, and in the scuffle, it is Willow who shoots Oz, saving everybody. Buffy bends Cain's gun with her bare hands using Slayer strength, and tells him to leave Sunnydale.

At school the next morning, Oz and Willow share their first kiss.

Themes
In an essay exploring the feminist ethics of Buffy, Shannon Craigo-Snell uses this episode as an example of how the series examines the threat of sexual violence facing women and girls as a "problematic background against which women attempt to have satisfying relationships with men." Craigo-Snell points out that this threat is embodied by the character of Larry, who sexually harasses Buffy (and other girls) during a gym class focused on self-defense, and the werewolf-hunter Cain, who says Buffy's failure to capture the werewolf is "what happens when a woman tries to do a man's job." The theme is made explicit when Giles describes werewolves as "potent, extreme representation of our inborn, animalistic traits", predatory and aggressive with no conscience, and Buffy responds, "In other words, your typical male."

Continuity
 
In the opening scene, Oz remarks on the moving eyes of the cheerleader trophy, a reference to schoolmate Amy Madison's evil mother, who was a former cheerleader, and was trapped in that statue in episode 3 of season 1, "Witch".
 
Xander says to Oz, "I know what it's like to crave the taste of freshly killed meat. To be taken over by these uncontrollable urges..." Thus, he inadvertently admits that he remembers being possessed by a hyena spirit in episode 6 of season 1, "The Pack". Buffy calls him on it, and he admits, "I said I didn't remember anything about that," but Buffy fails to pursue it.
 
Oz becomes a werewolf, a defining characteristic of his character for the remainder of the series. He was turned into a werewolf by a bite from his younger cousin who was in human form at the time.

References

External links 

 

Buffy the Vampire Slayer (season 2) episodes
1998 American television episodes
American LGBT-related television episodes
Television episodes about werewolves